Pothahi railway station is a railway station on the Patna–Gaya line under Danapur railway division of the East Central Railway zone. The station is situated at Pothahi in Patna district in the Indian state of Bihar.

History
Gaya was connected to Patna in 1900 by East Indian Railway Company by Patna–Gaya line. The Gaya to Jahanabad was electrified in 2002–2003. Electrification of the Patna–Gaya line was completed in 2003.

References

Railway stations in Patna district
Danapur railway division